Lurlean Hunter (December 1, 1919 – March 11, 1983) was an American contralto singer.

Early years
Born in Clarksdale, Mississippi, Hunter was taken to Chicago when she was two months old. She attended Englewood High School in Chicago.

Career
Hunter's first paid singing performance came when she appeared with Red Saunders and his orchestra at Club DeLisa on Chicago's South Side. She was signed by Discovery Records in 1950.

In 1951, Hunter was a featured performer with George Shearing and his quintet at Birdland in New York City. Later that year, she was among a group of "rising young stars of jazz" presented at the Streamliner night club in Chicago. Other Chicago venues at which she performed included the Club Silhouette and the Cloister Inn, where an initial four-week booking turned into a 2.5-year stay. Her work in other cities included singing at the Jazz Villa in St. Louis, the Roosevelt Hotel in New York, and the Circus Lounge in Ottawa, Ontario, Canada.

In 1961, Hunter began recording for Atlantic, with "Blue and Sentimental" as her first album for that label. She also recorded for RCA Victor.

In 1963, Hunter became the first African-American performer hired by WBBM radio in Chicago. After a successful on-air audition, she became a member of the staff of the all-live Music Wagon Show. On August 2, 1968, National Educational Television jazz broadcast featured Hunter, accompanied by the Vernel Fournier Trio, performing "ballads and blues, old and new".

Hunter made commercials for products such as peas and telephone directories.

"Lonesome Gal" court case
In 1958, radio disc jockey Jean King, who broadcast using the name "Lonesome Girl," sued RCA Record Division after it used Lurlean Hunter's image and name on the cover of its "Lonesome Gal" record album (LPM-1151, 1956). The suit in United States District Court, Southern District of California, alleged "unfair competition, infringement of trade name, unfair business practices, unjust enrichment and invasion of the right of privacy." The court acknowledged that the album contained the song "Lonesome Gal", and that the use of one song's title for an album's title was common practice in the recording industry. However, it ruled in King's favor on the basis that she was the first person to "adopt and establish the name Lonesome Gal as a personality" and that name was exclusively associated with her. Damages of $22,500 were awarded to King, and the company was ordered to destroy all material containing Hunter's likeness in conjunction with "Lonesome Gal".

Personal life
On December 7, 1952, Hunter married Charles Taylor, a shoe salesman. She later married Greg Tischler, who also was her manager.

References 

20th-century American women singers
American women jazz singers
American jazz singers
Singers from Mississippi
1919 births
1983 deaths
20th-century American singers